Koh Dek Koul Khmer: កោះដេកកោល, Nail island is a small island in the Gulf of Thailand located about 7 km off the coast of Sihanoukville city, in southern Cambodia. The exclusive Mirax Resort is based on Koh Dek Koul.

See also  
Koh Rong Sanloem
Koh Sdach
 List of islands of Cambodia
List of Cambodian inland islands
Sihanoukville

References

Islands of Cambodia
Islands of the Gulf of Thailand
Geography of Sihanoukville province